Juan José Rodríguez Prats (born 17 March 1946) is a Mexican lawyer and politician affiliated with the National Action Party. As of 2014 he served as Senator of the LVIII and LIX Legislatures of the Mexican Congress representing Tabasco and as Deputy of the LV and LVII Legislatures.

References

1946 births
Living people
20th-century Mexican lawyers
Members of the Senate of the Republic (Mexico)
Members of the Chamber of Deputies (Mexico)
National Action Party (Mexico) politicians
20th-century Mexican politicians
21st-century Mexican politicians
Universidad Veracruzana alumni
Politicians from Chiapas
People from Pichucalco